Palle Tillisch (2 August 1920 – 12 December 1994) was a Danish rower. He competed at the 1952 Summer Olympics in Helsinki with the men's coxless pair where they were eliminated in the semi-finals repêchage.

He was married on 2 February 1959 to Bodil Sprechler.

References

1920 births
1994 deaths
Danish male rowers
Olympic rowers of Denmark
Rowers at the 1952 Summer Olympics
People from Gentofte Municipality
European Rowing Championships medalists
Sportspeople from the Capital Region of Denmark
Progress Party (Denmark) politicians
Members of the Folketing 1973–1975